Liang, known in historiography as the Later Liang (1 June 907 – 19 November 923) or the Zhu Liang, was an imperial dynasty of China and the first of the Five Dynasties during the Five Dynasties and Ten Kingdoms period. It was founded by Zhu Wen (Emperor Taizu), after he forced the last emperor of the Tang dynasty to abdicate in his favour (and then murdered him). The Later Liang would last until 923 when it was destroyed by the Later Tang dynasty.

Rulers

Rulers' family tree

See also
Huang Chao
Jiedushi
Tang Dynasty

Notes

References 

 

 
Five Dynasties and Ten Kingdoms
Dynasties in Chinese history
Former countries in Chinese history
10th-century establishments in China
907 establishments
923 disestablishments
10th-century disestablishments in China
States and territories established in the 900s
States and territories disestablished in the 920s